Dirty Vegas are an English house music group initially made up of Ben Harris and Paul Harris (no relation) on instruments and production and Steve Smith on vocals. The group formed in 2001, then broke up in 2005 before reforming in December 2008 to record new material.

They are best known for their international hit single "Days Go By", which gained mainstream popularity in a 2003 Mitsubishi Eclipse television commercial, and for remixing songs created by other artists.

History

Early success
Dirty Vegas's debut release was the single "Days Go By." It originally made the top 30 in 2001, but when reissued in 2002 reached the top 20 in the UK. They released their self-titled debut album in June 2002 and a second album, One, in 2004.

The song "Days Go By", from their eponymous first album, gained wide exposure in the US when it was used in a 2003 Mitsubishi Eclipse commercial. The song went on to win the 2003 Grammy Award for Best Dance Recording. 

They have remixed songs for artists such as Justin Timberlake and Madonna.

Present day
The group played their last concert together in May 2005. After the band's breakup, Smith released his first solo album This Town on 18 February 2008, on his own G.A.S. Records label.  During their hiatus from the public, they began working on the film score for Boys & Girls Guide To Getting Down.  

After four years, Paul Harris and Steve Smith decided to reform and returned with their third studio album Electric Love in April 2011. In April 2013, the band released the EP 'Let the Night, which reached No.4 in US iTunes Dance Album chart and gained Gold status in Italy. Their fourth and latest studio album, entitled Photograph, was released via iTunes in September 2015. "Days Go By" was featured on the video game Grand Theft Auto V, for the Xbox One, PS4 and PC on the in-game radio. The further enhanced versions of the game on PS5 and Xbox Series X/S retain this song.

Pop culture
The band has also appeared on a variety of television shows such as FOX television's drama Standoff, where "Late Nights and Street Fights" was used as the show's theme song, FOX's The O.C. where "Closer" appeared in episode 32 entitled “The SnO.C.”, and One Tree Hill where the single "Walk Into The Sun" appeared in episode 214. Dave Chappelle has parodied the Mitsubishi Eclipse television commercial.

Discography

Studio albums

Remix albums
 A Night at the Tables by Dirty Vegas Sound System (2003)
 The Trip (2003)
 Stealth Live! (2009)

Extended plays
 The Story So Far (2009)
 Electric Love Acoustic EP (2012)
 Let the Night (2014)

Singles

Songwriting and Production Credits

Filmography

Musical scores
 The Boys & Girls Guide To Getting Down (2006)
 Goal! - The Movie Soundtrack (2005)

See also
 List of number-one dance hits (United States)
 List of artists who reached number one on the US Dance chart

References

External links
 Official site

Ableton Live users
English dance music groups
English house music groups
British musical trios
Musical groups from London
Electronic dance music duos
Grammy Award winners for dance and electronic music
Musical groups established in 2001
Musical groups disestablished in 2005
Musical groups reestablished in 2008
Remixers
Capitol Records artists
Parlophone artists